The 2011 CollegeInsider.com Postseason Tournament (CIT) was a postseason single-elimination tournament of 24 NCAA Division I teams. The CIT began with 12 first-round games. Four of the teams that won first-round games advanced to the quarterfinals, while the other eight teams played for the right to advance to the quarterfinals in the second round March 18–19. The announcement of the 2011 field was made on March 13, 2011.

Twenty-three of the participants were selected from teams that were not invited to the 2011 NCAA Tournament or the 2011 National Invitation Tournament.  The winner of the 2011 Great West Conference men's basketball tournament, North Dakota, received an automatic bid to the CIT.

The tournament was won by Santa Clara who defeated Iona in the championship game 76–69. Santa Clara was not one of the four teams to receive a second-round bye thus becoming the first team to win five games to win the tournament championship.

Participating teams
The following teams received an invitation to the 2011 CIT:

Format
Twelve teams advanced from the first-round games. Of the twelve remaining teams, four received byes into the quarterfinals. RPI, strength of schedule, conference ranking and geographic location determined the byes and seeding of the remaining twelve teams.

Bracket
Bracket is for visual purposes only. The CIT does not have a set bracket.
East Tennessee State, Iona, Northern Iowa and Ohio received byes to the quarterfinal round following their first round victories.

Home teams are listed second.
* Denotes overtime period.

References

CollegeInsider.com Tournament
CollegeInsider.com Postseason Tournament